Nimco Elmi Ali, better known by her stage name Nimco Happy, is a Somali singer known in her country for her numerous hits and has staged several plays in Somalia.

Life and career 
Happy was born in Mogadishu, Somalia, but grew up in Hargeisa and Nairobi, and now lives in Mogadishu. She comes from an artistic family, mostly poets.

Happy started her career in 2015 but gained fame when she released "Isii Nafta" in 2017, the song become hit in Somalia. In 2021, Happy came to worldwide attention after "Isii Nafta", went viral on the video sharing platform TikTok. The song was noted for the fact that the singer sang in several languages, in particular, in addition to the main languages ​​of Somali language, in English, Swahili and Arabic.  The success of the song led Happy to sign with record label Polydor and release the song officially on October 28 as "Isii Nafta (Love You More than My Life)" on Spotify and other music streaming service.

Personal life 
48

Happy was married but later divorced her husband with whom she had children. On 17 November 2021, she married her boyfriend.

Discography 

• Jab Iima Laabno · 2021

• Isii Nafta · 2021

References 

Living people
Year of birth missing (living people)

so:Nimco Happy